Moore County Airport , is located in Dumas, Texas, United States.

Facilities and aircraft
Moore County Airport is situated on 306 acres in Dumas, Texas, 2-miles west of the central business district, and contains two runways.  The primary 1/19, is paved with asphalt, measuring 6,001 x 100 ft (1,829 x 30 m). The second runway, 14/32, is also paved with asphalt, measuring 3,440 x 60 ft (945 x 18 m).

For the 12-month period ending June 25, 2009, the airport had 7,230 aircraft operations, an average of 20 per day: 58% local general aviation, 41% transient general aviation, and <1% military aviation. At that time there were 3 aircraft based at this airport: 66% single-engine and 33% multi-engine.

Moore County Airport has three certified instrument approach procedures (IAP): Two RNAV (GPS) and one VOR-A approaches.

References

Airports in Texas
Transportation in Moore County, Texas
Buildings and structures in Moore County, Texas